Marconi Wireless Station Site may refer to one of many Marconi Stations, including:

Cape Cod, Barnstable County, Massachusetts
 Marconi Wireless Station Site (South Wellfleet, Massachusetts), from 1901 to 1917
 Marconi–RCA Wireless Receiving Station, from 1914 to the 1990s
 Chatham Marconi Maritime Center, a museum and WA1WCC amateur radio station site

Kahuku, Hawaii
Marconi Wireless Telegraphy Station (Kahuku, Hawaii)

Elsewhere in North America
 New Brunswick Marconi Station, in Somerset, New Jersey, opened in 1914, and used by the U.S. Navy as station NFF from 1917 to 1918 
 Marconi and Marconi Wireless Station National Historic Sites, 2 sites on Cape Breton Island, Nova Scotia

See also
 Marconi Station, an article and list of Marconi wireless stations and sites